The Gokarnanatheshwara Temple, otherwise known as Kudroli Sri Gokarnanatha Kshetra, is in the Kudroli area of Mangalore in Karnataka, India. It was consecrated by Narayana Guru. It is dedicated to Gokarnanatha, a form of Lord Shiva. This temple was built in 1912 by Adhyaksha HoigeBazar Koragappa.

This temple is now accepted as "Aadi" by the Billava community.

The temple is 2 km from the centre of Mangalore city. The temple has Gopuram (tower like structure) decorated with murals of various gods and goddesses. Murals depict scenes from Hindu epics and legends.

History

Origin 
The Billava community  wanted to carve a niche for themselves in the realm of spirituality. They wanted to be able to personalise the spiritual offering to their deity Lord Shiva with norms in accordance to the billava tradition. It is in such a scenario that Adhyaksha Koragappa a billava leader and businessman took the initiative and sought a Guru for this spiritual quest.

Adhyaksha Koragappa led a delegation of Billava elders and visited Shri Narayana Guru in 1908. He invited Shri Narayana Guru to guide the billavas to build a temple.

The community found a messiah in Narayana Guru to guide them in this spiritual quest. Narayana Guru with his knowledge and experience in spirituality  became the ideal guide and guru (from the south of India closest to Mangalore) for the billavas to help them build a temple of their deity, Lord Shiva.

Adhyaksha Koragappa was a very well known businessman in Mangalore who had a large tile factory. He also conducted extensive trade in the 1900s with business enterprises in Middle East, Africa, Singapore, Malaysia, Sri Lanka and Myanmar, trading mainly in Mangalore tiles, copra, spices and other natural products

On the arrival of Shri Narayana Guru in Mangalore, Adhyaksha Koragappa gave him a horse-driven carriage to select a suitable place for a temple. Narayana Guru between places Mulihithilu (where a lot of linga Roopa Aradhana used to happen especially from saints of NATH tradition) and Kudroli, selected Kudroli.

Koragappa family still maintains the CHAIR on which Shri Narayana Guru sat in Adhyaksha Koragappa's house and addressed Adhyaksha Koragappa and others regarding various issues including the creation of a temple.

Adhyaksha Koragappa then gave the necessary land and funds to build this temple in 1912 seeking blessings and spiritual guidance of Shri Narayana Guru. The Shiva linga was brought by Shri Narayana Guru himself.

Renovation 
Shri H. Somasunder, Adhyaksha Koragappa's son was the president, during whose tenure effort was put into renovating the temple. Shri H. Somasunder along with Vishwanath approached Shri Janardhan Poojary for the same. This was the start of the renovation of the temple with the help of the people in various forms from all parts of the world especially Mangalore, Udupi and Mumbai.
Sthapadi K. Dakshinamoorthy was the architect who designed and built the present temple in the Chola style of architecture from its original Kerala style. The new gopuram is 60 feet in height and very beautiful. The renovated Gokarnanatha Kshethra was inaugurated by the former Prime Minister of India Rajiv Gandhi in 1991, shortly before his assassination during an election rally. A marble statue of Narayana Guru was erected at the entrance of the temple in 1966 and a crown studded with precious gems was given by the devotees later. It's estimated the renovation cost Rs. 1 crore, and now it has become one of the largest temples in Mangalore.

Later in the year 2007 Bhagwaan Hanumaan Mandir was built in the Gokarnanatha Kshethra premises at the entrance. Bhagwaan Hanumaan Mandir in turn adds beauty to the Kshethra.

The samadhis of H. Koragappa, H. Somappa along with their deceased family members lie with appropriate markers in the family plot in Gori Gudde (cemetery) in Attavar, Mangalore. The tomb of Uggappu, Shri Koragappa's mother can still be found in Gori Gudde erected by  Shri Koragappa himself

Adhyaksha Koragappa (who sometimes used 'C' Coragappa instead of 'K' to bring luck in business) was also a great devotee of Bhagawan Nityananda of Ganeshpuri and Bhagawan performed several miracles at the home of Adhyaksha Koragappa on Goodshed Road in Bunder. The first meeting of Bhagawan Nityananda and Adhyaksha Koragappa is described in the book Avadhoot Bhagawan Nityananda, on page 31. The book is authored by Swami Vijayananda of Nityananda Dhyana Mandira, Bevinakoppa.

Today HS Sairam, Adhyaksha Koragappa's grandson is the president and continues this legacy and vision of Shree Adhyaksha Koragappa to help spirituality empower and enable masses. This along with Sairam's effort to enhance the grandeur of the temple, the latest addition being the Mahastamba where he personally visited Kerala and got the design crafted by able designers.
The eminent Indian-American mathematician, distinguished Professor at Rutgers University and Fellow of the American Mathematical Society, Sagun Chanillo, is a great grandson of Adhyaksha Koragappa and the grandson of H. Somappa.

Miracles of Narayana Guru 

Narayana Guru was revered in the southern part of India for his spiritual quests in the field of non dualism . He performed many miracles helping people all along

Festivals 
The temple observes many festivals. Maha Shivaratri, Krishnashtami, Ganesh Chaturthi, Nagara Panchami, Deepavali, Navaratri, Sri Narayana Jayanthi are celebrated with traditional gaiety and splendour. It has worshipers from all over the world. The temples branches are in Mulki, Udupi and Katpady.

The birthday of Sri Narayana Guru is ceremoniously followed. The Kshethra also follows the ritual of feeding devotees who visit it daily.

Community Sri Satyanarayana Pooja, Sri Shani Pooja, free mass marriages and distribution of scholarship to deserving students are traditions, too. Today, the Kshethra attracts devotees from all religions and communities. The Billava community has come of age. The Kshethra can be rightly called the melting pot of all religions symbolising unity in diversity.

Navaratri 
The dasara festival is celebrated with much grandeur. The dasara celebrations of this temple is popularly called Mangalore Dasara. Mangalore Dasara was started by B.R.Karkera.
In addition to idols of Sharada Matha and Maha Ganapati, life-size idols of Nava Durgas are installed in the premises in an attractive way during Navaratri. All religious rites are observed for the entire period. Tableaux form a special part of the festivities and are taken around the main thoroughfares of Mangalore.
Mangalore Dasara is celebrated in a very spectacular way by worshiping the idol of Ganesh, Adhi Shakthi Maatha, Sharada Maatha, Navadurgas such as Shaila Puthri Maatha, Brahmachaarini Maatha, Chandrakaantha Maatha, Kushmaandini Maatha, Skanda Maatha, Kathyaahini Maatha, Maha Kaali Maatha, Maha Gowri Maatha and Siddhi Dhaathri Maatha. All these idols are grandly worshiped for nine days of navarathri. On the tenth day, these idols are taken in the grand procession of Mangalore Dasara throughout the city; the procession returns to Gokarnanatha Kshethra on the next day morning where all the above idols are immersed in the lake inside the temple premises.

Connectivity

This temple is situated in Kudroli which is about 5 km north of Mangalore Central. This temple is accessible from Statebank by bus(Route no 1,7,13) and from KSRTC, Airport by Auto rikshaw and Taxi.

Controversies
Shri Janardhan Poojary performed Urul seva (rolling around the temple) so that Sonia Gandhi could be cured, and she could win the General elections of 2014. Since Shri Poojary is very much part of the administration of this temple, it would appear that the temple administration has injected politics into religion.

Gallery

See also
 Temples built by Narayan Guru
Mangalore Dasara

References

External links
 Mangaluru Pete

Narayana Guru
Hindu temples in Mangalore
Tourist attractions in Mangalore
108 Shiva Temples